Duhnke is a surname. Notable people with the surname include:

 Manuel Duhnke (born 1987), German footballer
 Marius Duhnke (born 1993), German footballer

German-language surnames